Kim Pyong-ho (born in 1960) is a North Korean politician. He is a member of the Central Committee of the Workers' Party of Korea and the chief editor of the party's organ, Rodong Sinmun.

Biography
He served as vice president of Korean Central News Agency, and was appointed president on February 22, 2010. At the 3rd Conference of the Workers' Party of Korea held in September 2010, he was elected as a member of the Politburo of the Central Committee of the Workers' Party of Korea. Through the decision of the 2nd plenary session of the 7th Central Committee of the Party held in October 2017, he was appointed chief editor of Rodong Sinmun.

In February 2012, he was awarded the Order of Kim Jong-il. Following the death of Kim Jong-il's in December 2011, he served as a member of his funeral commission.

References

Recipients of the Order of Kim Jong-il
North Korean propagandists

ko:김병호 (조선민주주의인민공화국의 정치인)